Corporate poverty is the practice of refusing to own property, either individually or corporately. This practice of Middle Ages religious communities developed based on Christian views on poverty and wealth. Practical considerations generally allow for some exceptions.

See also

References

Christian ethics
Simple living
Poverty